James Smith & Sons is an umbrella shop in London. The premises in New Oxford Street is Grade II* listed.

History
It was founded by James Smith as a single shop in Foubert's Place in 1830.  Further branches were established in Savile Row and New Burlington Street and the main premises is now in New Oxford Street.  The shop-fittings there were constructed around 1865 and the shop still has a traditional Victorian character.

In popular culture
 In the 2011 movie Captain America: The First Avenger, the storefront of James Smith & Sons appears in the CGI background of a shot, but the name is changed to Henry Cooper & Sons. 
 In the 2014 biography A Spy Among Friends: Kim Philby and the Great Betrayal, historian Ben Macintyre includes the detail that Philby owned a James Smith and Sons umbrella
The shop featured in episode four of the BBC's 2015 production of Agatha Christie's Partners in Crime.
 In the movie Spooks: The Greater Good, the shop is used as dead drop point for agents contacting each other covertly.
The shop is mentioned and illustrated in the children's book Gaspard's Foxtrot by Zeb Soanes and James Mayhew.

See also
 Thomas Brigg & Sons
 Fulton Umbrellas
 Swaine Adeney Brigg

References

External links

Official homepage

Grade II* listed buildings in the London Borough of Camden
Umbrella manufacturers
Shops in London